The Azergues is a river in the department of Rhône, eastern France. It is a right tributary of the Saône, which it joins in Anse. Its source is in the Beaujolais hills, near Chénelette. The Azergues flows through the following towns: Lamure-sur-Azergues, Le Bois-d'Oingt, Chessy, Châtillon, Chazay-d'Azergues and Anse.

Etymology 

It has been suggested that the name Azergues comes from the Arabic "Azraq", which means blue.

References 

Rivers of France
Rivers of Rhône (department)
Rivers of Auvergne-Rhône-Alpes